Peechi-Vazhani Wildlife Sanctuary is a wildlife sanctuary headquartered in Peechi, Thrissur District of Kerala, India. The sanctuary was established in 1958 consisting of Palappilli- Nelliyampathi forests including the area of Chimmony Wildlife sanctuary
and is the second oldest sanctuary in Kerala.

References

External links

Wildlife sanctuaries in Kerala
Geography of Thrissur district
Protected areas established in 1958
Malabar Coast moist forests
Protected areas of Kerala
Tourist attractions in Thrissur district
1958 establishments in Kerala